Pantar, officially the Municipality of Pantar (Maranao: Inged a Pantar;), is a 5th class municipality in the province of Lanao del Norte, Philippines. According to the 2020 census, it has a population of 26,599 people.

History
The town was created and detached from the municipality of Balo-i on June 11, 1978, by virtue of Presidential Decree No. 1551. Its first appointed mayor and first elected mayor was Judge Cosain D. Campong, a primer.

Presidential Decree No. 1551, 11 June 1978, Section 1:

Geography

Barangays
Pantar is politically subdivided into 21 barangays.

Climate

Demographics

Economy

References

External links
 Pantar Profile at the DTI Cities and Municipalities Competitive Index
 [ Philippine Standard Geographic Code]
Philippine Census Information
Local Governance Performance Management System

Municipalities of Lanao del Norte
Establishments by Philippine presidential decree